Sukhwinder Singh (born 11 May 1983) is an Indian footballer who currently plays for Real Kashmir as a goalkeeper.

Career

Air India
Singh made his debut for Air India F.C. on 20 September 2012 during a Federation Cup match against Mohammedan at the Kanchenjunga Stadium in Siliguri, West Bengal in which he started the match; Air India lost the match 0–1.

Mohammedan
Singh made his debut for Mohammedan in the I-League on 10 October 2013 against Bengaluru at the Bangalore Football Stadium and played the whole match; as Mohammedan lost the match 2–1.

Career statistics

Club
Statistics accurate as of 27 October 2013

Honours
Real Kashmir
I-League 2nd Division (1) : 2017-18

References 

1979 births
Living people
I-League players
Association football goalkeepers
Indian footballers
Mohammedan SC (Kolkata) players
Real Kashmir FC players